The Armenian Hockey League (AHL) is the highest level of ice hockey competition in Armenia. The league was founded in 2000 and currently consists of four teams: Yerevan Capitals, Artsakh Hockey, Vanadzor Bears, and Gyumri Mambas.

History
The first season of the league was the 2000-2001 season.

Champions
Seasons include:
2000-2001 - ASC Yerevan
2001-2002 - No Championship
2002-2003 - Dinamo Yerevan
2003-2004 - Dinamo Yerevan
2004-2005 - Dinamo Yerevan
2005-2006 - SKA Yerevan
2006-2007 - Urartu Yerevan
2007-2008 - Urartu Yerevan
2008-2009 - Urartu Yerevan
2009-2010 - Urartu Yerevan
2010-2011 - Urartu Yerevan
2011-2012 - Urartu Yerevan
2012-2013 - Ararat Yerevan
2013-2014 - Ararat Yerevan
2014-2015 - Urartu Yerevan
2015-2016 - Ararat Yerevan
2016-2017 - Ararat Yerevan

See also

 Ice hockey by country
 Ice hockey in Armenia
 Ice Hockey Federation of Armenia
 Sport in Armenia

References

 
Top tier ice hockey leagues in Europe